Sybra preapicetriangularis is a species of beetle in the family Cerambycidae. It was described by Breuning in 1973.

References

preapicetriangularis
Beetles described in 1973